Phyllida Ann Law  (born 8 May 1932) is a British actress, known for her numerous roles in film and television.

Early life
Law was born in Glasgow, the daughter of Meg "Mego" and William Law, a journalist. Prior to the Second World War, her father was a journalist with the Glasgow Herald who "kept odd hours"; when the war broke out, he went into the air force and separated from his wife, later divorcing. Law would not see her father again until she was 18. Law's mother Meg worked in a dress shop in Glasgow during the war. The family also included Law's brother, James, her elder by five years, and their maternal grandmother, the wife of a Presbyterian minister, and "a fierce Presbyterian" herself whom Law "did not like as a child but can now admire."

She attended Glasgow Girls High up to age seven. The war began in September 1939 and Law and her brother were evacuated to family friends outside Glasgow in Lenzie, East Dunbartonshire, and attended a local school there, before Law transferred to Skelmorlie, Ayrshire, and then a school near the Clyde. At 13 she passed an entrance exam for Badminton School in Bristol, and became a boarder there. Leaving the school at 17, she initially accepted a place at university to read French and Literature, but disliked the experience and left. She then auditioned for the Bristol Old Vic School, intending to train as a stage designer, and discovered – by "happy mistake" – that she wanted to act instead. 

Law was married to actor Eric Thompson from 1957 until his death in 1982. Their daughters, Emma and Sophie Thompson, are both actresses.

Career
Law has worked extensively in television, including appearances in Dixon of Dock Green, Rumpole of the Bailey and the 1972 adaptation of the Lord Peter Wimsey tale The Unpleasantness at the Bellona Club. She appeared in films such as Peter's Friends (1992), Much Ado About Nothing (1993) (playing Ursula, alongside daughter Emma as Beatrice) and The Winter Guest (1997) (playing Elspeth, alongside daughter Emma as Frances).

She was in the original London cast of La Cage aux Folles at the London Palladium in 1986, playing the role of Jacqueline.

In 2004, she guest-starred in the Rosemary & Thyme episode entitled "Orpheus in the Undergrowth" as May Beauchamp. In 2007 she guest-starred in two Doctor Who spin-off adventures: as Bea Nelson-Stanley in The Sarah Jane Adventures story "Eye of the Gorgon" and as Beldonia in the audio drama Doctor Who: The Bride of Peladon. In 1963 Law had auditioned for one of the original four regular leads in Doctor Who, "Miss McGovern". She did not win the part, the name of which was subsequently changed to Barbara Wright.

Also in 2007 she played Aunt Auriel in the drama Kingdom starring Stephen Fry. In 2008 she appeared as a guest star in Foyle's War.

In November 2009, Law published her first book. Notes to my Mother-In-Law concerns the 17 years Law's mother-in-law lived with the family from the mid-1960s until her death. In January 2010 she appeared with Tony Slattery on Ready Steady Cook. She starred alongside John Hurt in a short film entitled Love at First Sight which was shortlisted for an Oscar in 2012.

Awards
In 2013 Law received an Honorary Doctorate from Glasgow Caledonian University and an Honorary Doctor of Letters from the Royal Conservatoire of Scotland.

Honours
Law was appointed an Officer of the Order of the British Empire (OBE) in the 2014 Birthday Honours by Queen Elizabeth the II for services to drama and for charitable services.

Filmography

Film

Partial television credits

Published works

References

External links

1932 births
Actresses from Glasgow
Living people
Officers of the Order of the British Empire
People educated at Badminton School
Scottish film actresses
Scottish radio actresses
Scottish stage actresses
Scottish television actresses
20th-century Scottish actresses
21st-century Scottish actresses
Writers from Glasgow
21st-century Scottish writers
21st-century Scottish women writers
British women memoirists
Scottish memoirists
BBC television presenters